Elena Davidovna Kats-Chernin  (born 4 November 1957) is a Soviet-born Australian pianist and composer, best known for her ballet Wild Swans.

Early life and career
Elena Kats-Chernin was born in Tashkent (now the capital of independent Uzbekistan, but then part of the Soviet Union) and is Jewish. She studied at the Yaroslavl Music School and the Gnessin State Musical College in Moscow from age 14, and migrated to Australia in 1975, continuing her studies at the Sydney Conservatorium of Music, under Richard Toop (composition) and Gordon Watson (piano). She also participated in the Darlinghurst underground theatre scene, with groups such as Cabaret Conspiracy, Fifi Lamour, Boom Boom La Burn and others, often under the name Elena Kats.

Europe
Kats-Chernin studied with Helmut Lachenmann in Germany. She remained in Europe for thirteen years, and became active in theatre and ballet, composing for state theatres in Berlin, Vienna, Hamburg and Bochum. In 1993 she wrote Clocks for the Ensemble Modern. It has since been performed around the world.

Australia
Since returning to Australia in 1994, Kats-Chernin has written several operas, two piano concertos and compositions for many performers and ensembles, including The Seymour Group, The Song Company, the Sydney Alpha Ensemble, Dame Evelyn Glennie, Bang on a Can All-Stars, Chamber Made Opera, the Australian Chamber Orchestra and the Sydney Symphony Orchestra. She was commissioned to write a piece, Page Turn, for the 2000 Sydney International Piano Competition. Her music was featured at the opening ceremonies of both the 2000 Sydney Olympic Games and the 2003 Rugby World Cup.

She wrote three silent film soundtracks for a co-production between German/French TV channels ZDF/ARTE: Victor Sjöström's  (The Phantom Carriage, 1921), Billy Wilder and Robert Siodmak's People on Sunday (1930), and G. W. Pabst's The Devious Path (1928). Kats-Chernin's other works include Charleston Noir for solo piano, Rockhampton Garden Symphonies with Mark Svendsen for solo voices, mixed choirs and orchestra, and Wild Swans, a collaboration with choreographer Meryl Tankard.

She has won numerous music composition prizes in Australia, and her pieces are regularly broadcast on ABC Classic FM radio. In 2009, Kats-Chernin was commissioned by the National Museum of Australia to write a piece for orchestra called Garden of Dreams, named for one of the architectural features of the museum, which premiered at the museum the same year.

Performances of Kats-Chernin's music are available on several commercially released recordings. One album is Chamber of Horrors, released in August 2006 by Tall Poppies Records. Chamber of Horrors includes Charleston Noir, for four basses; Chamber of Horrors, for harp (1995), played by Alice Giles; Still Life, for viola and piano (2001); Gypsy Ramble, for viola, cello and piano (1996); Wild Rice, for cello (1996); and Velvet Revolution, for horn, violin and piano (1999).

Kats-Chernin's "Eliza Aria" from her score for the ballet Wild Swans (ABC Classics) is used in Lloyds TSB's 2007 television advertisements. In 2010, Wild Swans became the theme music for ABC Radio National's Late Night Live program until the end of 2015.

Kats-Chernin has written a number of ragtime pieces for piano; one of these, "Russian Rag", was used in two different instrumental ensemble arrangements, as the theme of Late Night Live until 2010. It is also used as the New York theme in Adam Elliot's feature film, Mary and Max.

Kats-Chernin is a represented composer of the Australian Music Centre.

A portrait of Kats-Chernin by Australian portrait artist Wendy Sharpe was acquired by the National Portrait Gallery (Australia) in 2019.

Honours and awards
Elena Kats-Chernin was appointed an Officer of the Order of Australia (AO) in January 2019 "for distinguished service to the performing arts, particularly to music, as an orchestral, operatic and chamber music composer".

ARIA Music Awards
The ARIA Music Awards is an annual awards ceremony that recognises excellence, innovation, and achievement across all genres of Australian music. They commenced in 1987. 

! 
|-
| 2005
| Wild Swans
|rowspan="2" | Best Classical Album
| 
|rowspan="2" | 
|-
| 2008
| Slow Food
| 
|-
| 2017
| Best Children's Album
| A Piece of Quiet (The Hush Collection, Vol. 16)(with Lior and The Idea of North)
| 
|-

Australian Women in Music Awards
The Australian Women in Music Awards is an annual event that celebrates outstanding women in the Australian Music Industry who have made significant and lasting contributions in their chosen field. They commenced in 2018.

|-
|rowspan="2"| 2021
|rowspan="2"| Elena Kats-Chernin
| Artistic Excellence Award
| 
|-
| Excellence in Classical Music Award
|

Sidney Myer Performing Arts Awards
The Sidney Myer Performing Arts Awards commenced in 1984 and recognise outstanding achievements in dance, drama, comedy, music, opera, circus and puppetry.

|-
| 2013 || Elena Kats-Chernin || Individual Award || 
|-

Works

Operas
 Iphis, Sydney, 1997
 Matricide, the Musical, Melbourne, 1998
 Mr Barbeque, Lismore, New South Wales, 2002
 Rage of Life, Antwerp, 2010
 George, Hannover-Herrenhausen, 2014
 The Divorce, for ABC Television, 2015
 The Monteverdi Trilogy
 Whiteley, 2019
 Jim Knopf und Lukas der Lokomotivführer, 2019
 , Staatstheater Kassel 2021, adaptation of Kenneth Grahame's children's book The Wind in the Willows

Ballets
 Wild Swans (including "Eliza Aria")

Vocal
 Land of Sweeping Plains, SA choir and piano (set to Dorothea Mackellar, My Country)
 Rockhampton Garden Symphonies, solo voices, mixed choirs and orchestra (with Mark Svendsen)
 The Uninvited Stranger, 2007, SATB choir (text by Sandy Jeffs)
 Human Waves, 2020, SATB choir (text by Tamara Anna Cislowska)

Instrumental
 Butterflying
 Blue Silence
 Cadences, Deviations and Scarlatti
 Calliope Dreaming, 2009
 Chamber of Horrors, for harp
 Charleston Noir
 Clocks
 Cinema
 Frankenstein (incidental music, 2013)
 Gypsy Ramble, for viola, cello and piano
 In Tension
 Intermezzo Days
 Lullaby for Nick
 Meditations of Eric Satie: Unsent Love Letters 
 Page Turn
 Peggy's Minute Rag
 Phoenix Story
 Purple Prelude
 Russian Rags
 Sand Waltz
 Schubert Blues
 Setting Out
 Slicked Back Tango
 Spirit and the Maiden
 Still Life, for viola and piano
 Stur in Dur
 Tast-en
 The Offering, Piano Quintet No. 1 (2016)
 Three Dancers (2015)
 Trio Grandios
 Variations in a Serious Black Dress
 Velvet Revolution, for horn, violin and piano
 Wild Rice, for cello (1996)
 Zoom and Zip

Orchestral/concertante
 Deep Sea Dreaming
 Garden of Dreams
 Harpsichord Concerto ("Ancient Letters"), for Mahan Esfahani
 Night and Now (for flute and orchestra)
 Ornamental Air (for clarinet and orchestra)
 Piano Concerto (Displaced Dances)
 2nd Piano Concerto
 Prelude and Cube
 Retonica
 Singing Trees
 Stairs
 Symphonia Eluvium
 Transfer
 Violin Concerto
 The Witching Hour, concerto for 8 double basses and orchestra (2016), commissioned for the Australian World Orchestra
 Inner Angels, commissioned for the Melbourne Youth Orchestra

Films
 Körkarlen (The Phantom Carriage)
 People on Sunday
 Abwege (The Devious Path)

References

External links
Elena Kats-Chernin at Boosey & Hawkes Music Publishing
All tracks from her 2005 album Ragtime & Blue, Kats-Chernin's Myspace page
Interview with Elena Kats-Chernin
"In the key of flat-out major" by Deborah Jones, The Australian, 24 April 2010
Audio and transcript of Kats-Chernin on convict love tokens, the subject of a movement in Garden of Dreams, National Museum of Australia
Audio and transcript of Kats-Chernin on "Kimberley points", the subject of a movement in Garden of Dreams, National Museum of Australia
"Trees have roots, Jews have legs", peopleofthebarre.tumblr.com, 4 August 2016

1957 births
Living people
20th-century classical composers
20th-century women composers
21st-century classical composers
21st-century women composers
21st-century classical pianists
Australian women classical composers
Australian film score composers
Australian opera composers
Australian classical pianists
Australian Jews
Deutsche Grammophon artists
Soviet emigrants to Australia
Soviet Jews
Uzbekistani emigrants to Australia
Uzbekistani Jews
Ballet composers
Composers for carillon
Ragtime composers
Women film score composers
Women opera composers
Gnessin State Musical College alumni
Helpmann Award winners
Officers of the Order of Australia
Musicians from Tashkent
Women classical pianists
20th-century women pianists
21st-century women pianists